eXI Wireless is a Canadian business that develops and manufactures Radio Frequency IDentification (RFID) wireless systems. eXI's RFID products include HALO, RoamAlert, and Assetrac. eXI Wireless was acquired by VeriChip Corporation in April 2004.

References

Companies established in 1980
Radio-frequency identification